Express News may refer to:
 Express News (TV channel), a Pakistan private TV channel
 Daily Express, an Urdu newspaper in Pakistan
 Express Newspapers, a British newspaper group
 San Antonio Express-News, an American daily newspaper
 Britain Express News, a British newspaper covering breaking news, national and international